The Type 1937J destroyer class was a design created by the Kriegsmarine in 1937. The destroyers were designed as ocean-going escort ships, which could attack and defend convoys in the Atlantic, while also being able to operate in tropical climates. The design was abandoned before any ships were ordered or laid down, largely because the range and speed requirements could not be achieved without reductions in armament, however it went on to influence later project studies: the Type 1938Ac, 1938Ad, and 1938B destroyers.

Development
The Type 1937J was designed in 1937, and was one of five project studies done by the Kriegsmarine in this year, the others being the Type 1937-I, II, III and IV destroyers. These five projects were all project studies for a "Type 1937 destroyer".

The Type 1937 destroyers were to be ocean-going escort ships, which could serve in the tropics and could attack and defend convoys in the Atlantic. They were planned as a replacement for the Type 1936 and Type 1936A destroyers. They were designed to be able to match any given enemy destroyer. They were not planned to be able to combat French flotilla leaders, a task that would be left to either a light cruiser, or else multiple Type 1937s, if needed.

The original design was purposefully made so as to avoid a hybrid cruiser-destroyer design, which would not be able to perform either role well. From this original design came forth the five project studies. Of these, the Type 1937J was deemed the best in terms of armament, with its five single  guns, and thus was further worked upon, while the others were cancelled. 

However, problems arose due to the inability of contemporary naval technology to simultaneously meet the requirements for weight, speed, range and armament. On 8 April 1938 German Grand Admiral Erich Raeder, the commander in chief of the Kriegsmarine, informed the Oberkommando der Marine (German Naval High Command) that the Type 1937J design work was to be stopped, and that a further eight Type 36 destroyers were to be built instead. Although no ships of the Type 1937J were ever ordered or laid down, they influenced the later project studies: the Type 1938Ac, 1938Ad, and 1938B destroyers.

Characteristics
They were to have a complement of 360 men. The Type 1937J destroyers were to be armed with five  quick firing guns, one  anti-aircraft gun, four  anti-aircraft guns, two twin  torpedo tubes and one quadruple 53.3 centimetre torpedo tube.

References

Citations

Books

 

 
Proposed ships of Germany